Jaroslav Doubek (17 June 1931 – 22 July 2017) was a Czech speed skater. He competed in two events at the 1956 Winter Olympics.

References

External links
 

1931 births
2017 deaths
Swiss male speed skaters
Olympic speed skaters of Czechoslovakia
Speed skaters at the 1956 Winter Olympics
Place of birth missing